Batic may refer to:

Batîc, a commune in Geamăna, Moldova
Batić Mirković, 15th century Bosnian nobleman and magnate
Batic (surname)

See also

Batik (disambiguation)